is the third studio album by Japanese singer/songwriter Chisato Moritaka, released on November 17, 1988 by Warner Pioneer. After her second album Mi-ha and her EP Romantic, Moritaka wrote the lyrics for the majority of the songs in this album; a trend that continued for the rest of her career.

The album peaked at No. 5 on Oricon's albums chart and sold over 66,000 copies, making it Moritaka's first top-five album. It was also her last album to be issued on LP.

Track listing 
All lyrics are written by Chisato Moritaka, except where indicated; all music is composed and arranged by Hideo Saitō, except where indicated.

Personnel 
 Chisato Moritaka – vocals
 Hideo Saitō – guitar, drum and synthesizer programming (all tracks except where indicated)
 Takumi Yamamoto – guitar, drum programming (A3, B5)
 Tomoaki Arima – synthesizer programming (A3, B5)
 Naoki Suzuki – synthesizer programming (A3, A4, B3, B5)
 Keiji Toriyama – synthesizer programming (B3)
 Ken Shima – keyboards (B3)
 Kenji Takamizu – bass (B3)
 Shingo Kanno – percussion (B3)
 Shinji Yasuda – backing vocals (A3, A4, B5)

Charts

Video album 

The video album for Mite was released on 8" LaserDisc on November 28, 1988 and on VHS on December 10, 1988. Its contents were compiled in the 2000 DVD Chisato Moritaka DVD Collection No. 5: Mite/The Stress/17-sai.

Track listing

References

External links 
 
 
 

1988 albums
Chisato Moritaka albums
Japanese-language albums
Warner Music Japan albums